Bell's Law may refer to:

Bell's Law or Bell–Magendie Law, a law demonstrated by Charles Bell, a Scottish surgeon, describing and distinguishing two types of roots of the spinal nerves, the motor and the sensory
Bell's law of computer classes, formulated by Gordon Bell in 1972, which describes how computer-equipment classes form, evolve, and may eventually die
Bell's First Law of Usenet, regarding spelling or grammar mistakes made when commenting on someone else's spelling or grammar mistakes

See also
Charles's law